Rechenberg is a surname of:

 Albrecht von Rechenberg (1861-1935), German jurist, diplomat and a politician
 Hans Albrecht von Rechenberg (1892-1953), German politician, FDP, Bundestag
 Helmut Rechenberg (19372–2016), German physicist and science historian
 Ingo Rechenberg (1934-2021), German researcher and professor in the field of bionics
 Nikolai von Rechenberg (1846–1908), Finnish lieutenant general

Surnames of German origin